The STEPS Centre (Social, Technological and Environmental Pathways to Sustainability) was an interdisciplinary research centre hosted at the University of Sussex, funded by the Economic and Social Research Council. The Centre's research brought together development studies with science and technology studies. It was launched at Portcullis House in London on 25 June 2007 and closed in 2022.

The STEPS Centre described its aim as to "highlight, reveal and contribute to just and democratic pathways to sustainability that include the needs, knowledge and perspectives of poor and marginalised people." Based at the Institute of Development Studies (IDS) and the Science Policy Research Unit (SPRU) at the University of Sussex in the UK, the centre worked with partners in Africa, Asia and Latin America.

Professor Ian Scoones  and Professor Andy Stirling were its co-directors. Professor Melissa Leach stepped down as STEPS Director in 2014 to become Director of the Institute of Development Studies.

Areas of work 

The STEPS Centre's research investigated the politics of sustainability in various domains, including climate change, food systems, urbanisation and technology. It focused on the perspectives and needs of marginalised people, particularly in poor countries and settings, and methodologies for including these priorities in policy appraisal and decision making. 

In the final four years of its research program, the STEPS Center focused on a series of themes with implications for the politics of sustainability, including transformations and social change, uncertainty and other forms of incertitude, multiple perspectives on nature and the environment, and methodologies for research and appraisal.

Pathways approach 

The STEPS Centre's pathways approach aims to understand the complex, non-linear interactions between social, technological and environmental systems. Some pathways may threaten poor peoples' livelihoods and health while others create opportunities for sustainability. 

The pathways approach draws attention to the influence of power in determining which narratives and problem framings are dominant in areas such as climate policy, conservation, technological innovation or agriculture, which pathways are pursued or neglected, and the appropriateness of different methodologies to highlight uncertainties, plural perspectives and values, and alternative actions. 

A paper published in 2007 entitled Pathways to Sustainability: an Overview of the STEPS Centre Approach outlined the STEPS Centre approach to understanding dynamic systems and their governance. The paper laid out the ingredients of the STEPS Centre's work, including linking diverse social and natural science perspectives, connecting theory, policy and practice and an engaged, interactive approach to communications. Promoting pathways to Sustainability that meet the perspectives and priorities of poor and marginalised groups is at the heart of the pathways approach.

Projects 

Among the STEPS Centre's projects are:

•Innovation, Sustainability, Development: A New Manifesto (40 years on from the Sussex Manifesto)
 A New Manifesto

• Crop, disease and innovation in Kenya - Maize and farming system dynamics in areas affected by climate change
Maize and climate change in Kenya

• Urbanisation in Asia - urbanisation and sustainability on the expanding peri-urban fringe of Delhi, India
Urbanisation in Asia

• Rethinking regulation - assumptions and realities of drug and seed regulation in China and Argentina
Rethinking Regulation

• Risk, uncertainty and technology - framing and responses to risks and uncertainties in areas of rapid scientific and technological advance
Risk, uncertainty and technology

• Epidemics, livelihoods and politics - HIV-AIDS, SARS, 'avian flu, BSE - procedures for addressing epidemics that support rather than compromise poor people
Epidemics, livelihoods and politics

Further reading 

 Dynamic Sustainabilities: Technology, Environment, Social Justice
By Leach. M, Scoones, I. and Stirling, A. (2010) 

 Pathways to Sustainability: an overview of the STEPS Centre approach
By Leach. M., Scoones, I. and Stirling, A. (2007) 

 Dynamics: Dynamic Systems and the Challenge of Sustainability
By Scoones, I., Leach, M., Smith, A., Stagl, S., Stirling, A. and Thompson, J. (2007)  Understanding Governance: pathways to sustainabilityBy Leach, M., Bloom, G., Ely, A., Nightingale, P., Scoones, I., Shah, E. and Smith, A. (2007) – Empowering Designs: towards more progressive appraisal of sustainabilityBy Stirling, A., Leach, M., Mehta, L., Scoones, I., Smith, A., Stagl, S. and Thompson, J. (2007)  Agri-food System Dynamics: pathways to sustainability in an era of uncertainty
By Thompson, J., Millstone, E., Scoones, I., Ely, A., Marshall, F., Shah, E.and Stagl, S. (2007)  

Health in a Dynamic World
By Bloom, G., Edström, J., Leach, M., Lucas, H., MacGregor, H., Standing, H. and Waldman, L. (2007)  

Liquid Dynamics: challenges for sustainability in water and sanitation
By Mehta, L., Marshall, F., Movik, S., Stirling, A., Shah, E., Smith, A. and Thompson, J. (2007)  
Time to outbreed animal science? A cattle-breeding system exploiting structural unpredictability: the WoDaaBe herders in Niger
By Krätli, S. (2008) The ISBN printed in the document (978 1 85864 699 5) is invalid, causing a checksum error.

The Slow Race: Making technology work for the poor
By Melissa Leach, Ian Scoones (2006) Demos pamphlet 
 More STEPS Centre publications

References

External links 
 The STEPS Centre
 STEPS Centre blog
 The STEPS Centre's YouTube channel
 The STEPS Centre's photostream on Flickr

University of Sussex
Research on poverty
Development studies
Science and technology studies